Futebol Clube Barreirense is a Portuguese sports club founded on 11 April 1911. The main sports are football and basketball. In both sports, the club has represented Portugal in European competitions. In basketball, the club won 2 national championships and 6 Portuguese Cups. The club also offers chess, gymnastics and kick-boxing.

Football

The football club became champion of the Segunda Divisão seven times. In the 1969–70 season, FC Barreirense achieved its highest place ever in the Primeira Divisão, reaching the 4th place. That team included player Manuel Bento. The following year, the club represented the country in the 1970–71 Inter-Cities Fairs Cup. They managed to win 2-0 against Dinamo Zagreb in Barreiro, but lost in the away game with 6-1 and were immediately eliminated.

Barreirense's major rival is G.D. Fabril, formerly Companhia União Fabril, with whom they have shared many seasons from the Primeira Liga all the way down to the Setúbal FA League.

Barreirense was known as a former of young players that developed impressive careers in the service of the biggest clubs and the Portugal national team. In particular, S.L. Benfica take a lot of great talent from Barreirense.

Honours
 Segunda Divisão: 7 
1942–43, 1950–51, 1959–60, 1961–62, 1966–67, 1968–69, 2004–05
 "FPF" Cup (Segunda Divisão): 1
1976–77
 Taça Ribeiro dos Reis: 1
1967–68
 Campeonato de Portugal Runners-up: 2
1929–30, 1933–34

Europe

Current squad

Basketball

Basketball started to be played at the club from 1927 onwards and over the years, Barreirense has always remained at the top of the Portuguese national basketball. They won two national championships, six cups and participated in the European Clubs Championship twice. On the first occasion, Barreirense played against Real Madrid CF. The game was the first game in a European competition for a Portuguese club and was the first basketball match to be broadcast live on Portuguese television. Barreirense, however, never won a match during their European campaigns.

FC Barreirense has won the national Under-20 and Under-16 championships several times, in addition to participating in several Final Four's.
The Club is the first portuguese Club to have a former school player, playing in NBA: Neemias Queta.

Honours

- Champion:
 2 Portuguese Championships (1956/1957; 1957/1958)
 6 Portuguese Cups (1956/1957; 1959/1960; 1962/1963; 1981/1982; 1983/1984; 1984/1985)
 10 Portuguese Championships Under-20 (1953/1954; 1955/1956; 1956/1957; 1965/1966; 1974/1975; 1976/1977; 2001/2002; 2005/2006; 2006/2007; 2008/2009)
 6 Portuguese Championships Under-18 (2000/2001; 2002/2003; 2003/2004; 2004/2005; 2005/2006; 2007/2008)
 10 Portuguese Championships Under-16 (1975/1976; 1994/1995; 1997/1998; 1998/1999; 2001/2002; 2002/2003; 2003/2004; 2004/2005; 2007/2008)

- Overall Ranking Portuguese Championships (Top 5)
 S.L. Benfica   - 85
 FC Porto       - 67
 FC Barreirense - 37
 A.D. Ovarense  - 26
 FC Porto       - 18

- Portuguese Championships Top 5:
 S.L. Benfica     - 41
 FC Porto         - 37
 FC Barreirense   - 32
 SC Vasco da Gama - 13
 Sporting CP      - 12

- Portuguese Championships Top 3 (Under-20 and Under-18):
 FC Barreirense - 18
 FC Porto       - 16
 S.L. Benfica   - 12

- Portuguese Championships Top 3 (Under-16):
 FC Barreirense - 10
 FC Porto       - 7
 S.L. Benfica   - 5

Europe

Notes

External links

 Official website of FC Barreirense
 Official website of FC Barreirense Basketball
 Blog Barreirense-Futebol. Contributo para a sua história
 Blog Barreirense-Velhas Glórias
 ForaDeJogo.net – FC Barreirense
 zerozero.pt – FC Barreirense

Association football clubs established in 1911
Football clubs in Portugal
1911 establishments in Portugal
Primeira Liga clubs
Liga Portugal 2 clubs
Sport in Barreiro, Portugal